UCI BMX World Championships are the world championships for BMX racing (bicycle motocross) held under the regulations of the Union Cycliste Internationale (UCI), the sport's international governing body.

The UCI BMX World Championships are held annually and the winner of each event is crowned the BMX Cycling World Champion. This three-day cycling festival should not be confused with the UCI BMX Supercross World Cup, which is the international BMX racing series held at numerous locations throughout the year.

The UCI awards a gold medal and a rainbow jersey to the winner. Silver and bronze medals are awarded to the second and third place contestants. World champions wear their rainbow jersey until the following year's championship, but they may wear it only in the type of event in which they won it.

Summary

IBMXF

UCI BMX 

(cancelled) 2020

Past winners
The following list includes world champions at the elite Championship Level and does not include the Cruiser Level, Challenge level or Juniors, as defined by the UCI BMX Rule Book.

Elite Men

Elite Women

Medals tables
These tables includes medalists in all Championship categories, both Men and Women, Junior and Elite, BMX and Cruiser.

Medal table

1996–2021, all events (As 2021)

Champions by year

Individual
Most decorated riders (Earned 3 or more medals in Elite Men or Elite Women):

Men

Women

Most Elite Men's Titles

Most Elite Women's Titles

See also
UCI Track Cycling World Championships – Men's keirin
UCI Track Cycling World Championships – Women's keirin
European BMX Championships

References

External links

Union Cycliste Internationale

 
World Championship
BMX
BMX
Men's cycle races
Recurring sporting events established in 1996